Banknotes of the Czechoslovak koruna may refer to:

 Banknotes of the Czechoslovak koruna (1919)
 Banknotes of the Slovak koruna (1939-45)
 Banknotes of the Czechoslovak koruna (1945)
 Banknotes of the Czechoslovak koruna (1953)

See also
 Czech koruna#Banknotes, from 1993